Ronald I. Friedman (born August 1, 1932) is an American television and film producer and writer most known for his work on such animated television shows as G.I. Joe, The Transformers and the Marvel Action Hour. He has also written for shows including Iron Man and Fantastic Four as well as the animated film The Transformers: The Movie.

Early life and education
Friedman attended Carnegie Mellon University, graduating with a Bachelor of Arts degree in Architecture.

Career
Friedman has written over 700 hours of episodes for many TV series, such as The Andy Griffith Show, The Good Guys, Bewitched, Gilligan's Island, All in the Family, The Odd Couple, Happy Days and That's My Mama.

In animation, Friedman created the G.I. Joe series and developed Transformers for American television, re-writing over 64 episodes. He also worked with Stan Lee to create The Marvel Action Hour. Friedman also has 42 feature scripts to his name, the most recent of which was just purchased by West Coast Film Partners for production in early 2011.

He has been nominated for multiple Emmy Awards, and has won several WGA Awards.

Friedman has appeared twice recently on Gilbert Gottfried's audio podcast and on Mark Evanier's video podcast in September 2020, cementing his reputation as one of the industry's most compelling raconteurs. His anecdote, told to Gottfried in their first podcast, about Lucille Ball telling him about her then-husband Desi Arnaz pulling a gun on Orson Welles and threatening to kill him if he didn't deliver a long-promised script (for The Fountain of Youth in 1956) remains particularly astonishing.

Screenwriting credits

Television
My Favorite Martian (1965)
Get Smart (1965-1966)
Bewitched (1965-1967)
Gilligan’s Island (1966-1967)
The Andy Griffith Show (1966-1967)
Love on a Rooftop (1967)
The Second Hundred Years (1967)
I Dream of Jeannie (1967-1969)
The Good Guys (1969)
The Ghost & Mrs. Muir (1969)
The Partridge Family (1970-1971)
The Odd Couple (1970-1973)
Funny Face (1971)
The Good Life (1971)
Getting Together (1971)
Me and the Chimp (1972)
The Super (1972)
Bridget Loves Bernie (1972)
Love, American Style (1972-1973)
Bob & Carol & Ted & Alice (1973)
Dusty’s Trail (1973)
Lotsa Luck (1974)
All in the Family (1974)
That’s My Mama (1974-1975)
Chico and the Man (1974-1978)
Barney Miller (1975)
Happy Days (1975)
Grady (1976)
Big John, Little John (1976)
Wonder Woman (1976)
All’s Fair (1976-1977)
Starsky & Hutch (1976-1978)
The San Pedro Beach Bums (1977)
Charlie’s Angels (1977)
Vegas (1978)
Fantasy Island (1978-1981)
The Dukes of Hazzard (1979)
B. J. and the Bear (1980)
Harper Valley PTA (1981)
Strike Force (1982)
Ace Crawford, Private Eye (1983)
9 to 5 (1983)
Small & Frye (1983)
The Fall Guy (1983-1985)
G.I. Joe: A Real American Hero (1983-1986)
Lime Street (1985)
American Playhouse (1987)
Bionic Six (1987)
Sledge Hammer! (1987)
Zorro (1990)
G.I. Joe: A Real American Hero (1990)
The New WKRP in Cincinnati (1992-1993)
Fantastic Four (1994)
Iron Man (1994)
Legend (1995)
Taz-Mania (1995)

Film
Lucy in London (1966)
The Wackiest Wagon Train in the West (1976)
Record City (1978)
Waikiki (1980)
Murder Can Hurt You (1980)
The Romance of Betty Boop (1985)
The Transformers: The Movie (1986)
G.I. Joe: The Movie (1987)

See also
 Hypnotia, a character he created

References

External links
 
 

American male screenwriters
1932 births
Living people
Television producers from Pennsylvania
American television directors
American television writers
Businesspeople from Pittsburgh
American male television writers
American male voice actors
Screenwriters from Pennsylvania